The 2007 Norwegian Football Cup was the 102nd season of Norwegian annual knockout football tournament. The competition started on 19 May 2007 with the first-round games and ended on 11 November 2007 with the final. The defending champions were Fredrikstad.

The format of the Cup has not changed for this season what means that, unlike other European cup competitions, all teams (including Tippeligaen ones) entered the Cup in the First Round. In the First and Second Round amateur teams (or at least lower-placed at the time of the draw) were seeded and played the matches at home ground. From the Third Round until the end the draw was random.

The winners, Lillestrøm, qualified for the second qualifying round of the 2008–09 UEFA Cup.

Calendar
Below are the dates for each round as given by the official schedule:

First round 

|colspan="3" style="background-color:#97DEFF"|19 May 2007

|-
|colspan="3" style="background-color:#97DEFF"|20 May 2007

|}

Second round 

|colspan="3" style="background-color:#97DEFF"|13 June 2007

|-
|colspan="3" style="background-color:#97DEFF"|14 June 2007

|}

Third round 
This was the last round in which the Norwegian FA determined match-ups.

|colspan="3" style="background-color:#97DEFF"|26 June 2007

|-
|colspan="3" style="background-color:#97DEFF"|27 June 2007

|-
|colspan="3" style="background-color:#97DEFF"|28 June 2007

|}

Fourth round 
From this round onwards, matches were drawn by lots.

|colspan="3" style="background-color:#97DEFF"|25 July 2007

|-
|colspan="3" style="background-color:#97DEFF"|26 July 2007

|-
|colspan="3" style="background-color:#97DEFF"|8 August 2007

|}

Quarter-finals

Semi-finals

Final

References
All fixtures, results and matchinfo have been retrieved from this page

 
Norwegian Football Cup seasons
Cup
Norway